Sita Ramulu is a 1980 Telugu-language drama film directed by Dasari Narayana Rao starring Krishnam Raju, Jaya Prada and Mohan Babu. The music was composed by Chellapilla Satyam. The song "Toli Sandhya Velalo" is a chartbuster and is remembered even today. This film is a remake of the Tamil film Kanavan Manaivi.

Relangi Narasimha Rao was assistant director of the film.

Plot
Ram, a labour union leader, falls in love with his employer, Sita, and eventually marries her. However, their marital bliss is short-lived as her evil manager tries to create a rift between them.

Cast
 Krishnam Raju as Ramu
 Jaya Prada as Sita
 Mohan Babu as Ravi
 Kaikala Satyanarayana as Ramu's father
 Allu Ramalingaiah as Ravi's father
 K. V. Chalam as constable
 Mikkilineni
 R. Narayana Murthy
 Chalapathi Rao
 Narra Venkateswara Rao
 Sukumari as Ramu's mother
 Dubbing Janaki
 Chidatala Appa Rao
 Jayamalini as item number
 Jyothi Lakshmi as item number

Soundtrack
The Music Was Composed By Chellapilla Satyam and Released by Saregama.

References

External links

1980 films
1980s Telugu-language films
Films directed by Dasari Narayana Rao
Indian drama films
Telugu remakes of Tamil films
Films scored by Satyam (composer)
Films about the labor movement
1980 drama films